Šiauliai Saulius Sondeckis Gymnasium of Arts (Lithuanian: Šiaulių Sauliaus Sondeckio menų gimnazija) is a state art gymnasium located in Šiauliai, Lithuania.

History 
In 1939, after Nazi Germany had occupied the Klaipėda region, the Klaipėda music school was closed afterwards. This resulted in the establishment of Šiauliai music school in the same year. It was founded by a conductor, teacher and professor Juozas Karosas.

After the end of the Second World War, the school was known as Šiauliai music tekhnikum, and later known as Šiauliai music high school. In 1990, a new additional teaching department was created where various music education took place. In 2010, Šiauliai Conservatory was named after the famous Lithuanian conductor and professor Saulius Sondeckis. Later it was known as Šiauliai Saulius Sondeckis School of Arts (since 2011) and Šiauliai Saulius Sondeckis Gymnasium of Arts (since 2013).

Every year gymnasium accepts students to 9–12 grades. Since 2012 primary classes exist as well.

Departments 
There are 13 minor departments in the gymnasium with two of them providing general education: 

 Accordion Department
 General Piano Department
 General Education Department
 General Music Theory Department
 Choir Conducting and Singing Department
 Fine Arts Department
 Piano Department
 Guitar Department
 Folk Instruments Department
 Primary Education Department
 Wind Instruments and Percussions Department
 String Instruments Department
 Additional General Piano Department

References 

Art schools in Lithuania
Educational institutions established in 1945
Secondary schools in Lithuania
1945 establishments in the Soviet Union